Astrosoniq (sometimes styled as A5tro5oniq) is a band from Oss, Netherlands.

Each of its album covers features hair growing out of skin. Sometimes a woman, sometimes a man, or sometimes a circle of flesh surrounded by hair.

Musical style
Astrosoniq's musical style is characterized by extremely psychedelic guitar riffs. The result is stoner rock with a space flavor. It integrates sound clips from old movies, Wonder Woman episodes and other sources. Most continue the themes of fantasy and space.

The band cites classic heavy rock artists as their influences, which can be seen in the heavy guitar riffs and drums.

Line-up
 Marcel van de Vondervoort - drums, production, mixing
 Ron van Herpen - solo guitar and vocals
 Robert-Jan Gruijthuijzen - bass guitar and vocals
 Fred van Bergen - vocals
 Teun van der Velden - keyboards and rhythm guitar

Discography
 2000 - Son of A.P. Lady (full album CD on Freebird Records).
 2002 - Soundgrenade (full album CD on Freebird Records).
 2005 - Made in Oss (6-song EP, both on 10" vinyl and CD on Spacejam Records).
 2006 - Speeder People (full album CD on Suburban Records).
 2007 - "Astrosuper" / "Superastro" (7" single, split with the Liszt on Spacejam Records)
 2009 - Quadrant (full album CD on Spacejam Records)
 2018 - Big Ideas Dare Imagination

References

External links
 Official Astrosoniq Website

Dutch rock music groups
Musical groups from North Brabant
Oss